The mayor of Brăila, officially the Mayor of the Municipality of Brăila, is the head of the Brăila City Hall in Brăila, Romania. The current mayor of Brăila is PSD member , who was elected in the 2020 Romanian local elections with over 50% of the votes. This is his second term, as he already was the mayor of the city from 2016 to 2020.

References

External links